Guam Highway 1 (GH-1), also known as Marine Corps Drive, is one of the primary automobile routes in the United States territory of Guam. It runs in a southwest-to-northeast direction, from the main gate of Naval Base Guam in the southwestern village of Santa Rita in a northeasterly direction to the main gate of Andersen Air Force Base in the village of Yigo. It passes through Guam's capital, Hagåtña, as well as intersecting other territorial highways. The highway runs through tropical forest, urbanized commercial areas, and residential neighborhoods. The US military upgraded and extended the road starting in 1941. Construction ceased with the Japanese invasion in December 1941 and resumed after the Second Battle of Guam in 1944. The highway was formally dedicated to the U.S. Marine Corps by the governor in 2004.

Route description
The southern end of GH-1 begins near the entrance gate to Naval Base Guam, at a junction with GH-2A. Known as Marine Corps Drive, the route then travels to the northeast through tropical forests along Apra Harbor to the town of Piti. After passing through Piti, the drive runs along Tepungon Beach before passing Asan Point. It runs parallel to the coast along War in the Pacific National Historical Park's Asan Invasion Beach through the community of Asan. At Ricardo J. Bordallo Governor's Complex in Adelup, it passes northward through the western edge of Hagåtña. In this area, GH-1 runs through commercial areas parallel to the West Agaña Beach Front area. The drive passes the Paseo de Susana and Skinner Plaza before following Trinchera Beach northeasterly through town.

After passing through the Hagåtña and an area of Mongmong-Toto-Maite below the cliffline, the road turns towards the northeast and reaches typically its most congested section in Tamuning at the intersection with Guam Highway 14. Curving northwest past the intersection with Guam Highway 10A that leads to Antonio B. Won Pat International Airport, Marine Drive passes John F. Kennedy High School and the area of Upper Tumon. It curves northeasterly around the Micronesia Mall and inland areas of upper, losing sight of the ocean, before turning inland and southeasterly through residential areas as it cuts across the southern edges of Dededo. It runs to the south of the Guam International Country Club and north of the forested military property known as Andersen South. Marine Corps Drive passes the War Dead Cemetery and turns northeasterly with residential areas on both sides of the roadway through Yigo before reaching its terminus at Salisbury Junction, the main entrance to the Air Force Base, where the road continues to the northwest as GH-9.

Like most major highways on Guam, a  speed limit is posted throughout most of its length. In the past, GH-1 was one of the few roads to post a  limit on lengths of less-developed roadway. However, as more of the area became developed, certain sections of the roads were posted with lower limits. Travelers heading north away from the developed areas are allowed a  speed limit. However, the southbound lanes on the same sections remain posted at  due to development on the western side of the road.

History
The United States military began to develop and construct roads on the island in 1941. Some roads had existed prior to this, but improvements were beginning to take shape. Only one road, which encircled most of the island, had been graded. It was the primary route linking Agana (the name of the capital at the time) to Piti and Asan. This was the foundation for Marine Corps Drive. After the Japanese invasion, little infrastructure improvements were made by the occupiers. Road construction resumed by the US military after the island was invaded in 1944. The remainder of the roadway was built and numbered under the local administration after Guam was given civil government in 1950.

The road was known as simply Marine Drive until it was rededicated by Governor Felix Perez Camacho in 2004. In 2012, the DPW has started to install LED streetlights along Marine Corps Drive. At the same time, construction has started to replace the Agana Bridge along GH-1.

Major intersections

See also

References

External links

 War in the Pacific National Historic Park